Digimask is an avatar technology that allows a user to input a front and (optional) side digital photo of their head which then automatically creates a fully articulated 3D model of that head. This 3D model can then be used in digital applications such as video games and mobile phones. Digimask technology is the core of the EyeToy: Cameo system for the PlayStation 2 video game console.

In 2001, Digimask was nominated for a BAFTA for Technical Innovation.

At E3 2006 it was announced that Digimask face-mapping technology would be available using the Xbox Live Vision Camera and featured in the Xbox 360 titles World Series of Poker: Tournament of Champions and Tom Clancy's Rainbow Six: Vegas.

Games 
The Digimask technology has appeared in the following games:

PlayStation 3 (PlayStation Eye) 
Tom Clancy's Rainbow Six: Vegas 2 - (2008), Ubisoft

Xbox 360 (Xbox Live Vision) 
FaceBreaker -  (2008), EA Sports
Football Manager 2007 - (2006), Sega
Pro Evolution Soccer 2008 - (2007), Konami
Pro Evolution Soccer 2009 - (2008), Konami
Tom Clancy's Rainbow Six: Vegas - (2006), Ubisoft
Tom Clancy's Rainbow Six: Vegas 2 - (2008), Ubisoft
World Series of Poker: Tournament of Champions - (2006), Left Field, Activision
World Series of Poker 2008: Battle for the Bracelets - (2008), Left Field, Activision

PlayStation 2 (EyeToy Cameo) 
EyeToy Cameo was developed jointly by SCEE and Digimask.

AFL Premiership 2006 (aka Gaelic Games: Football) - IR Gurus, SCEE
EyeToy: Play 2 - (2004), SCEE
F1 Career Challenge - (2003), EA
Formula One 05 - (2005), SCEE
Karaoke Revolution Country - (2006), Harmonix Music, Konami
Karaoke Revolution Party - (2005), Harmonix Music, Konami
Karaoke Revolution Presents: American Idol - (2007), Blitz Games, Konami
MLB 07 The Show
This is Football 2005 (aka World Tour Soccer 2006) - SCEE
World Rally Championship 3 (2003), Evolution, SCEE

See also 
 Avatar (virtual reality)
 EyeToy

External links 
 , Digimask official website [LINK DOWN]
 , Digimask Technology Interview [LINK DOWN]

Virtual reality